Nizhny Novgorod Radio Laboratory was the first Soviet science laboratory in the field of radio electronics. It was based in 1918 in Nizhny Novgorod. In 1928, the laboratory was reorganized and moved into the Central Radio Laboratory in Leningrad.

References
Остроумов Б. А. В.И.Ленин и Нижегородская радиолаборатория. История лаборатории в документах и материалах. — Л.: Наука, 1967.

Radio technology
Buildings and structures in Nizhny Novgorod
Cultural heritage monuments of regional significance in Nizhny Novgorod Oblast